Phil McKnight (15 June 1924 – 25 May 2018) was a Scottish footballer, who played for Alloa Athletic, Chelsea and Leyton Orient.

References

External links 

1924 births
2018 deaths
Footballers from Glasgow
Scottish footballers
Association football wing halves
Alloa Athletic F.C. players
Chelsea F.C. players
Leyton Orient F.C. players
Scottish Football League players
English Football League players
London XI players